Sentinel Peak, Sentinel Mountain, or variations, may refer to:
 Sentinel Peak (Antarctica)
Sentinel Range, Antarctica
 Sentinel Peak (Alberta), Canada
 Sentinel Peak (British Columbia), Canada
 El Centinela (Baja California, Mexico)
 El Centinella (Colima, Mexico)
 Sentinel Peak (New Zealand)
 Sentinel Peak (Drakensberg, South Africa)
 United States
 Sentinel Peak (Alaska)
 Sentinel Peak (Arizona)
 Sentinel Peak (Inyo County, California)
 Sentinel Peak (Tulare County, California)
 Sentinel Peak (Colorado)
 Sentinel Peak (Idaho)
 Sentinel Peak (Montana)
 Sentinel Peak (Nevada)
 Sentinel Peak (New Mexico)
 Sentinel Peak (Oregon)
 Sentinel Peak (Washington) in the North Cascades
 Sentinel Peak (Jefferson County, Washington) in the Olympic Mountains